Robert Ned Harris (July 9, 1916 – December 12, 1976) was a Major League Baseball outfielder.

In 262 games, Harris posted a .259 batting average (211-for-814) with 107 runs, 16 home runs, 81 RBI and 102 bases on balls.

External links

Major League Baseball right fielders
Detroit Tigers players
Beaumont Exporters players
Buffalo Bisons (minor league) players
Portland Beavers players
West Palm Beach Indians players
Baseball players from Iowa
1916 births
1976 deaths